James Patrick may refer to:

Sportspeople
 James Patrick (ice hockey) (born 1963), former ice hockey defenceman
 James Patrick (Canadian football) (born 1982), Canadian football cornerback

Others
 James Patrick (British Army officer), Irish Guards officer and equerry
 James McIntosh Patrick (1907–1998), Scottish etcher and painter
 James Patrick (shipowner) (1880–1945), founder of an Australian shipping firm
 James Patrick (sociologist) (born 1940s), pseudonym of a Scottish sociologist
 Jim Patrick (born 1945), Idaho politician

See also